The Leuchters was an English automobile produced in 1898.  A motor tricycle similar to the De Dion, it was famously advertised as being "made entirely in Leeds".

See also 
 List of car manufacturers of the United Kingdom

References
David Burgess Wise, The New Illustrated Encyclopedia of Automobiles.

Defunct motor vehicle manufacturers of England
Defunct companies based in Leeds